Aristides of Thebes, was an ancient Greek painter.

Life
He lived in the 4th century BC. He had a reputation for expressiveness: for example, a picture of his representing a dying mother's fear lest her infant should suck death from her breast became celebrated. He also painted one of Alexander the Great's battles. King Attalus of Pergamon allegedly bought one of his pictures for 100 talents.

The painter Ariston was his son and pupil.

References

Ancient Greek painters
Ancient Thebans
Art of ancient Boeotia
Painters of Alexander the Great
4th-century BC Greek people
4th-century BC painters